DiepCity was a South African TV series which is created by Mandla N, Phathutshedzo Makwarela & Mpumelelo Nthlapo it first aired on the 5 April 2021 it replaced Isibaya after 8 years. The show was cancelled in 3 March 2023 with a triumph 240 episodes without the usual 260 episodes.

Plot
4 poor girls who live in Diepsloot trying to make a living ending with getting into crime with their master Elliot Gedeza (Mduduzi Mabaso), but when a heist goes wrong, Nokuthula "Nox" Jele's (Nozuko Ncayiyane) brother Sbusiso Jele (Paballo Khoza) gets killed she was arrested for 5 years.

Cast

Awards and nominations

References

External links

South African television soap operas
2021 South African television series debuts
M-Net original programming
Television shows set in Johannesburg, South Africa